Terbium(III) iodide (TbI3) is an inorganic chemical compound.

Production
Terbium(III) iodide can be produced by reacting terbium and iodine.

An alternative method is reacting terbium and mercury(II) iodide at 500 °C.

Structure
Terbium(III) iodide adopts the bismuth(III) iodide (BiI3) crystal structure type, with octahedral coordination of each Tb3+ ion by 6 iodide ions.

References

Iodides
Terbium compounds
Lanthanide halides